Linda Johnson may refer to:

Linda P. Johnson (1945-2020), American politician from North Carolina
Linda Johnson (poker player), American professional poker player
Linda Johnson (politician), Canadian politician from Alberta

See also
Linda O. Johnston, American author of mystery and romance novels
Lynn Johnson (disambiguation)
Linda Johnsen (born 1954), author on yoga and other aspects of Hinduism